Kaseem Bentley is an American stand-up comedian.

SF Weekly has described Bentley's humor as the "best racial humor you don't feel guilty laughing at," and touches on racial stereotypes without being racist, challenges conventions of being politically correct or nice on stage, yet keeps the audience on his side by turning the insults on himself and keeping them funny.

On May 3, 2019, Bentley released his debut comedy album Lakeview. The album is named after the San Francisco neighborhood he grew up in.

References

External links

Year of birth missing (living people)
Living people
21st-century American comedians
American stand-up comedians
African-American stand-up comedians
Place of birth missing (living people)
21st-century African-American people